The 2015–16 Eastern Washington Eagles Women's basketball team will represent Eastern Washington University during the 2015–16 NCAA Division I women's basketball season. The Eagles, were led by fifteenth year head coach Wendy Schuller and play their home games at Reese Court. They are members of the Big Sky Conference. They finished the season 20–12, 13–5 in Big Sky play to finish in a 3-way tie for second place. They advanced to the semifinals of the Big Sky women's tournament where they lost to Idaho State. Despite having 20 wins, they were not invited to a postseason tournament.

Roster

Schedule

|-
!colspan=8 style="background:#a10022; color:#FFFFFF;"| Exhibition

|-
!colspan=8 style="background:#a10022; color:#FFFFFF;"| Non-conference regular season

|-
!colspan=8 style="background:#a10022; color:#FFFFFF;"| Big Sky regular season

|-
!colspan=9 style="background:#a10022; color:#FFFFFF;"| Big Sky Women's Tournament

See also
2015–16 Eastern Washington Eagles men's basketball team

References

Eastern Washington Eagles women's basketball seasons
Eastern Washington
Eastern Washington
Eastern Washington